Leptodactylus leptodactyloides is a species of frogs in the family Leptodactylidae. Its local name is sapito leptodactilo ("slender-fingered toadlet"). It is found in the greater Amazon Basin and the Guianas (Bolivia, Brazil, Colombia, Ecuador, French Guiana, Guyana, Peru, Suriname, and Venezuela). Leptodactylus leptodactyloides occurs in a range of habitats: savannas, open areas, forest edges, and secondary and primary lowland forest. Reproduction takes place in temporary waterbodies.

References

leptodactyloides
Amphibians of Bolivia
Amphibians of Brazil
Amphibians of Colombia
Amphibians of Ecuador
Amphibians of French Guiana
Amphibians of Guyana
Amphibians of Peru
Amphibians of Suriname
Amphibians of Venezuela
Amphibians described in 1945
Taxonomy articles created by Polbot